The fourth season of S.W.A.T., an American police procedural drama television series, premiered on November 11, 2020 and concluded on May 26, 2021 on CBS with 18 episodes produced.

The season dealt with real life serious issues such as the COVID-19 pandemic, and racial tension in Los Angeles between law enforcement and the Black community following the aftermaths of the Killing of Breonna Taylor, and the Murder of George Floyd.

For the 2020–21 U.S. television season, the fourth season of S.W.A.T. ranked #42 with a total of 5.96 million viewers.

Cast and characters

Main
 Shemar Moore as Sergeant II Daniel "Hondo" Harrelson Jr.
 Alex Russell as Officer III James "Jim" Street
 Lina Esco as Officer III Christina "Chris" Alonso
 Kenny Johnson as Officer III+1 Dominique Luca 
 David Lim as Officer III Victor Tan
 Patrick St. Esprit as Commander Robert Hicks
 Jay Harrington as Sergeant II David "Deacon" Kay

Recurring
 Amy Farrington as Lieutenant Detective Piper Lynch
 Lou Ferrigno Jr. as Sergeant Donovan Rocker
 Obba Babatundé as Daniel Harrelson Sr.
 Gabrielle Dennis as Briana Harrelson
 DeShae Frost as Darryl Henderson
 Bre Blair as Annie Kay
 Otis "Odie" Gallop as Sergeant Stevens
 Rochelle Aytes as Nichelle Carmichael
 Susan Chuang as Chan Fei
 Chris L. McKenna as DEA Agent Simons
 David Gautreaux as Edward Yannick
 Lyndie Greenwood as Erika Rogers
 David Rees Snell as Detective John Burrows
 Michael Beach as Leroy Henderson
 Joy Osmanski as FBI Agent Jennifer Carr
 Karissa Lee Staples as Bonnie Lonsdale-Tan
 Adam Aalderks as Lee Durham

Guest 
 Peter Onorati as Sergeant II Jeff Mumford
 Sherilyn Fenn as Karen Street
 Laura James as Molly Hicks
 Cathy Cahlin Ryan as Wendy Hughes

Episodes

Production
On May 6, 2020, CBS renewed the series for a fourth season.

Broadcast and release
The fourth season of S.W.A.T. was set to be a mid-season premiere. However, on July 14 it was announced that it would switch places with Survivor, and premiered on November 11, 2020.

Reception

Ratings

Home media

References

External links

2020 American television seasons
2021 American television seasons
Television productions postponed due to the COVID-19 pandemic